The Department of Social Reforms of state of Tamil Nadu is one of the Department of Government of Tamil Nadu

Present Ministers for Social Reforms 
Dr. V. Saroja

Former Ministers for Social Reforms 
 2011 - 2016
 B. Valarmathi

References

External links
 http://www.tn.gov.in/departments/social_reforms.html (Official Website of the Tamil Nadu Social Reforms Department)
 Official website of Government of Tamil Nadu

Tamil Nadu state government departments
1999 establishments in Tamil Nadu